Aleksander Polaczek (born, August 9, 1980) is a German former professional ice hockey forward who played in the Deutsche Eishockey Liga (DEL).

Playing career
After playing with the Frankfurt Lions in their final season in 2010, Polaczek signed a one-year contract with the Hamburg Freezers. On February 9, 2011, Polaczek signed a one-year extension with the Freezers to remain through to the 2011–12 season.

Producing only 12 points in a diminished role in 52 games, Polaczek was released as a free agent and signed a one-year deal with Grizzly Adams Wolfsburg on April 2, 2012.

After three seasons with Wolfsburg, Polaczek signed a one-year contract with fellow German club, Augsburger Panther on April 8, 2015.

Upon completion of the 2017–18 season with Augsburger, Polaczek ended his professional career after 19 seasons.

Career statistics

Regular season and playoffs

International

References

External links 

1980 births
Living people
Augsburger Panther players
ERC Ingolstadt players
Frankfurt Lions players
Hamburg Freezers players
Polish emigrants to Germany
Sportspeople from Opole
Grizzlys Wolfsburg players
German ice hockey forwards